Muhaisnah is a locality in Dubai, United Arab Emirates (UAE). Situated in eastern Dubai in Deira.

Neighborhoods
Muhaisnah comprises four sub-communities:
 Madinat Muhaisnah (or Muhaisnah 1)
 Muhaisnah 2
 Muhaisnah 3
 Muhaisnah 4

Madinat Muhaisnah and Muhaisnah 2 are bounded to the west by route E 311 (Shaikh Mohammed Bin Zayed Road) and to the east by route D 56, while Muhaisnah 3 and Muhaisnah 4 are bounded to the west by route D 60 (Al Rashidiya Road) and to the west by E 311. Al Muhaisnah is bordered by Al Qusais, Al Twar, Al Mizhar and Mirdif. With over 235,000 residents, Muhaisnah is the most populated community in Dubai.

Muhaisnah 2, 3 and 4 comprise an area that was once a burial ground. However, these sub-localities now house several collective labour accommodations and labour camps for the mainly South Asian labourers that service the industrial areas of Al Qusais, as well as construction workers who mainly support real estate projects south of Dubai Creek. This area is referred to as Sonapur (literally, Land of Gold in Urdu/Hindi) by expatriate labourers. Recently, living conditions in the collective labour camps were criticised by Human Rights Watch, as being "less than human". As a result of the criticism, the Dubai government closed down 100 labour camps that failed to meet basic standards set by the Dubai Municipality.

However in the past couple of years, Muhaisnah area has a number of new residential projects being constructed, mainly due to the Expo 2020 construction boom in Dubai.

Climate

Facilities

Shopping
Madina Mall
Lulu Village

Medical Centers
There are several medical centers:
Aster Medical Clinic
DocIB

Education
Schools in the area include:
Islamic School for Training and Education
St. Mary's Catholic High School
 Gulf Model School
Buds Public School
Russian International School in Dubai
Lycée Libanais Francophone Privé
Oxford School Dubai
Indian Academy Dubai
Philadelphia Private School (PPS), Dubai
United International Private School, Dubai
Greenwood International School

References

External links 

 Menon, Sunita. "Workers live amid pools of sewage". Gulf News. March 10, 2007
 Ellis, Eric. "Dubai's Labor Ghetto". Asia Sentinel. February 10, 2008.

Communities in Dubai